¿Quién amará a María? ("Who will love María?") is a Colombian telenovela produced and broadcast by Caracol TV, since 25 March 2008, starring Katherine Porto, Nicolás Rincón, Gustavo Ángel, Didier Van der Hove, Jorge López and Santiago Alarcón. Due to poor ratings, it ended abruptly on 2 June 2008.

Plot
The telenovela deals with a woman, Marcia, who has been betrayed by her husband and decides to remake her life, looking for "the perfect" man and the man who she wants to be the father of her children (her biggest dream is to have a child). Marcia decides to "become" four different women, all of them called María (María Daisy, María Angelica, María Consuelo and María Magdalena). Each one of them manages to conquer a man, thus Marcia ends up dating four men simultaneously.

External links
  Official site
  Gallery
 

2008 telenovelas
2008 Colombian television series debuts
2008 Colombian television series endings
Colombian telenovelas
Caracol Televisión telenovelas
Spanish-language telenovelas
Television shows set in Colombia